The Truth About Husbands is a 1920 American silent drama film directed by Kenneth Webb and starring Anna Lehr, Holmes Herbert, and Elizabeth Garrison. It was released in December 1920.

Cast list
 Anna Lehr as Janet Preece
 Holmes Herbert as Dustan Renshaw
 Elizabeth Garrison as Mrs. Stonehay
 May McAvoy as Leslie Brownell
 Richard Gordon as Hugh Murray
 Ivo Dawson as Lord Randolph
 Arthur Rankin as Wilfred Brownell
 Lorraine Frost as Irene Stoney

Controversy
In 1916, there were protests to showing this film by men of Pine City, Minnesota, which was booked at their local cinema, Family Theatre.  They viewed it as too controversial.

References

External links 
 
 
 

American silent feature films
1920 drama films
1920 films
Silent American drama films
Films directed by Kenneth Webb
American black-and-white films
First National Pictures films
1920s English-language films
1920s American films